Fallout: An American Nuclear Tragedy is a 1989 book by Philip L. Fradkin which was republished in a second edition in 2004. The book is about the radiation exposure of people and their livestock living downwind from the nuclear weapons testing at the Nevada Test Site in the 1950s. The case of Irene Allen et al. vs. the United States is used as a framework for the narrative. The court case "resulted in an award of $2.66 million in damages to eight persons with leukemia, one with thyroid cancer, and another with breast cancer".

Philip Fradkin is an American environmentalist historian and journalist. Fradkin shared a Pulitzer Prize awarded to the metropolitan staff of the Los Angeles Times for coverage of the Watts riots in 1965.

See also
 Alvin C. Graves
 List of books about nuclear issues
 Nuclear fallout

References

External links
Fallout 
Exposure of the American Population to Radioactive Fallout from Nuclear Weapons Tests

1989 non-fiction books
20th-century history books
American history books
Books about nuclear issues
Environmental non-fiction books
Nuclear fallout
History of the Southwestern United States
History of Nevada
History of Utah